OJSC Concern Galnaftogaz is a Ukrainian chain of gas stations branded as "OKKO". The company was founded in 2001 by a merger of Ivanofrankivsknaftoprodukt, Zakarpatnaftoprodukt–Uzhhorod, and Zakarpatnaftoprodukt–Khust. As of December 2015, the OKKO network had more than 400 gas stations. It is the third largest gas station network in Ukraine with a market share of over 17%.

Following the results of 2014, Galnaftogaz became one of the 32 Ukrainian companies that were included in the ranking of the 500 largest companies in Eastern Europe according to the American consulting group Deloitte.

Description
The main office of the company is located in Lviv. The Chairman of the Supervisory Board of Galnaftogaz is Vitaliy Antonov.

The concern Galnaftogaz is a part of the holding company Universal Investment Group. The holding coordinates the functioning of an extensive network of gas stations, cafes, shops, restaurants, laboratories and oil depots.

References

External links 

 https://web.archive.org/web/20090418030857/http://galnaftogas.com/
 https://web.archive.org/web/20111008084451/http://www.uigroup.com.ua/pgs/multy_pop.php?n_id=461
 http://www.okko.ua/ 
 https://web.archive.org/web/20090822175554/http://www.okko-card.com.ua/
 http://www.myfishka.com/
 https://web.archive.org/web/20090729093450/http://www.pulls.okko.ua/

Oil and gas companies of Ukraine
Companies based in Lviv
Ukrainian companies established in 2001